The Roman Catholic Diocese of Płock is a diocese located in the city of Płock in the Ecclesiastical province of Warszawa in Poland.

Sunday mass attendance in 2013 was 30.7% of the population (39.1% Polish average) placing it to the group of less religious dioceses in the country.

History
 1075: Established as Diocese of Płock
 During the German occupation of Poland (World War II), the Archbishop of Płock Antoni Julian Nowowiejski and the auxiliary Bishop  were imprisoned in the village of Słupno, and then in 1941 murdered in the Soldau concentration camp, where also many other priests from Płock were killed. Nowowiejski and Wetmański are now considered two of the 108 Blessed Polish Martyrs of World War II by the Catholic Church. The Cathedral's ancient treasury, church archives and the diocesan library in Płock were robbed by the Germans, and taken to museums in Königsberg, Wrocław and Berlin.
 2018: Płock Cathedral along with the entire Wzgórze Tumskie ("Tumskie Hill") listed by the President of Poland as a Historic Monument of Poland.

Special churches
Minor Basilicas:
 Bazylika pw. Zwiastowania NMP, Czerwińsk(Assumption)
 Bazylika pw. Zwiastowania NMP (Parafię św. Mateusza), Pułtusk (Annunciation)

Leadership

 Bishops of Płock (Roman rite)
 Archbishop Wojciech Baranowski (1591–1607)
 Archbishop Henryk Firlej (1617–1624)
 Bishop Jan Gembicki (1655.05.11 – 1674.03.13)
 Bishop Andrzej Chryzostom Załuski (1692.10.15 – 1699.05.25)
 Bishop Andrzej Stanisław Załuski (1723.11.22 – 1736.11.19)
 Bishop Antoni Sebastian Dembowski (1737–?)
 Bishop Józef Eustachy Szembek (1753–1758)
 Archbishop Michał Jerzy Poniatowski (1773–1784)
 Bishop Iraklij Listovskyj (1783 – 1809.08.30)
 Bishop Krzysztof Hilary Szembek (1784.10.02 – 1797.09.05)
 Bishop Ivan Krasovskyj (1809.09.22 – 1826)
 Bishop Tomasz Ostaszewski, S.J. (1815.09.04 – 1817.01.17)
 Bishop Adam Michał Prażmowski (1818–?)
 Archbishop Wincenty Teofil Popiel (1863.03.16 – 1875.07.05)
 Archbishop Franciszek Albin Symon (1897.07.21 – 1901.04.15)
 Archbishop Jerzy Józef Elizeusz Szembek (1901–1903)
 Archbishop Apollinary Wnukowski (1904.04.01 – 1908)
 Archbishop Antoni Julian Nowowiejski (1908.06.12 – 1941.05.28)
 Bishop Tadeusz Paweł Zakrzewski (1946.04.12 – 1961.11.26)
 Bishop Bogdan Sikorski (1964.01.21 – 1988.02.04)
 Archbishop  Zygmunt Kamiński (1988.02.04 – 1999.05.01)
 Archbishop Stanisław Wielgus (1999.05.24 – 2006.12.06)
 Bishop Piotr Libera (2007.05.02 – 2022.06.04)
 Bishop Szymon Stułkowski (since 2022.10.31)

See also
Roman Catholicism in Poland

References

Sources
 GCatholic.org
 Catholic Hierarchy
  Diocese website

11th-century establishments in Poland
1075 establishments in Europe
Plock
Plock